Ibrahim Amil (born 6 May 1978) is a retired Maldivian international footballer.

Club career
Amil started his career at Club Eagles in 2001 and then moved to New Radiant for the next two seasons. He played a half season for Island FC in 2004, before moving to Club Valencia. Later he played again for Island FC before returning to New Radiant and was with the club until 2009. Amil was away from football in 2010 due to unknown reasons, but spent one last season at Club Eagles in 2011.

International career
Amil represented Maldives in SAFF Championship and FIFA World Cup qualification matches.

References

External links 
Ibrahim Amil at maldivesoccer.com

1978 births
Living people
Maldivian footballers
Maldives international footballers
Club Valencia players
New Radiant S.C. players
Association football defenders
Club Eagles players